Marc Minardi is a Canadian actor. He portrayed Lucas Valieri on Degrassi: The Next Generation for the seventh season. He was also on the television show Ace Lightning, where he played a lead role for 39 episodes.

Minardi is in a band, and he enjoys writing his music. He also has many interests and passions in the sports field. While not pursuing his dreams in sports and acting, he spends his free time enjoying his other favorite hobbies: writing and directing.

Minardi was born in Hamilton, Ontario. His interests include cars and film.

Filmography
 Degrassi: The Next Generation - Lucas Valieri
 1-800-Missing (2006) - Phil Vanier
 The Perfect Man (2005) - Kid 1
 Ace Lightning (2002–2004) - Chuck Mugel
 Blue Murder - (2004) - Teenager
 Odyssey 5 - (2002) - Sci Fi Kid

External links
 Official Site
 

Living people
21st-century Canadian male actors
Canadian male film actors
Canadian male television actors
Year of birth missing (living people)